The Gilaki language is an Iranian language of the Northwestern branch, spoken in Iran's Gilan Province. Gilaki is closely related to Mazandarani and the two languages have similar vocabularies. Though the Persian language has influenced Gilaki to a great extent, Gilaki remains an independent language with a northwestern Iranian origin. The Gilaki and Mazandarani languages (but not other Iranian languages) share certain typological features with Caucasian languages (specifically South Caucasian languages), reflecting the history, ethnic identity, and close relatedness to the Caucasus region and Caucasian peoples of the Gilak people and Mazandarani people.

Classification

The language is divided into three dialects: Western Gilaki, Eastern Gilaki and Galeshi/Deylami. The western and eastern dialects are separated by the Sefid River, while Galeshi is spoken in the mountains of eastern Gilan and western Mazandaran.

There are three main dialects but larger cities in Gilan have slight variations to the way they speak. These "sub-dialects" are Rashti, Rudbari, Some’e Sarai, Lahijani, Langerudi, Rudesari, Bandar Anzali, Alamouti, Taleghani and ....Fumani.
 
Gilaki, which has two main dialect types, eastern and western, with the Safidrūd River as the general border, is a member of the Caspian subgroup.  There are many subdialects of Gilaki, and, progressing to the east, it gradually blends into Mazandarani. The intermediate dialects of the area between Tonokābon and Kalārdašt serve as a transition between Gilaki and Mazandarani. The differences in forms and vocabulary lead to a low mutual intelligibility with either Gilaki or Mazandarani, and so these dialects should probably be considered a third separate language group of the Caspian area.
In Mazandaran, Gilaki is spoken in the city of Ramsar, Tonekabon and Chalus. Although the dialect is influenced by Mazandarani, it is still considered a Gilaki dialect.

Furthermore, the eastern Gilaki dialect is, spoken the entire valley of the Chalus river.
 
Apart from four Turkish-speaking villages higher up, the inhabitants of Alamut speak Gilaki and those of Rudbar Tati. In Qazvin province, Gilaki is spoken in northern parts of the province, in Alamut.

Grammar
Gilaki, is an inflected and genderless language. It is considered SVO, although in sentences employing certain tenses the order may be SOV. Nonetheless, the language has many grammatical similarities to English.

Dispersion 

Gilaki is the language of the majority of people in Gilan province and also a native and well-known language in Mazandaran, Qazvin and Alborz provinces. Gilaki is spoken in different regions with different dialects and accents. The number of Gilaki speakers is estimated at 3 to 4 million.

Phonology
Gilaki has the same consonants as Persian, but different vowels. Here is a table of correspondences for the Western Gilaki of Rasht, which will be the variety used in the remainder of the article:

There are nine vowel phonemes in the Gilaki language:

The consonants are:

Verb system

The verb system of Gilaki is very similar to that of Persian. All infinitives end in -tən/-dən, or in -V:n, where V: is a long vowel (from contraction of an original *-Vdən). The present stem is usually related to the infinitive, and the past stem is just the infinitive without -ən or -n (in the case of vowel stems).

Present tenses
From the infinitive dín, "to see", we get present stem din-.

Present indicative
The present indicative is formed by adding the personal endings to this stem:

Present subjunctive
The present subjunctive is formed with the prefix bí-, bú-, or bə- (depending on the vowel in the stem) added to the indicative forms. Final /e/ neutralizes to /ə/ in the 3rd singular and the plural invariably lacks final /i/.

The negative of both the indicative and the subjunctive is formed in the same way, with n- instead of the b- of the subjunctive.

Past tenses

Preterite
From xurdən, "to eat", we get the perfect stem xurd. To this are added unaccented personal endings and the unaccented b- prefix (or accented n- for the negative):

Imperfect
The imperfect is formed with what was originally a suffix -i:

Pluperfect
The pluperfect is paraphrastically formed with the verb bon, "to be", and the past participle, which is in turn formed with the perfect stem+ə (which can assimilate to become i or u). The accent can fall on the last syllable of the participle or on the stem itself:

Past subjunctive
A curious innovation of Western Gilaki is the past subjunctive, which is formed with the (artificial) imperfect of bon+past participle:

This form is often found in the protasis and apodosis of unreal conditions, e.g., mən agə Əkbəra bidé bim, xušhal bubosti bim, "If I were to see/saw/had seen Akbar, I would be happy".

Progressive
There are two very common paraphrastic constructions for the present and past progressives. From the infinitive šon, "to go", we get:

Present progressive

Past progressive

Compound verbs
There are many compound verbs in Gilaki, whose forms differ slightly from simple verbs. Most notably, bV- is never prefixed onto the stem, and the negative prefix nV- can act like an infix -n-, coming between the prefix and the stem. So from fagiftən, "to get", we get present indicative fagirəm, but present subjunctive fágirəm, and the negative of both, faángirəm or fanígirəm. The same applies to the negative of the past tenses: fángiftəm or fanígiftəm.

Nouns, cases and postpositions
Gilaki employs a combination of quasi-case endings and postpositions to do the work of many particles and prepositions in English and Persian.

Cases
There are essentially three "cases" in Gilaki, the nominative (or, better, unmarked, as it can serve other grammatical functions), the genitive, and the (definite) accusative. The accusative form is often used to express the simple indirect object in addition to the direct object. A noun in the genitive comes before the word it modifies. These "cases" are in origin actually just particles, similar to Persian ra.

Nouns
For the word "per", father, we have:

The genitive can change to -i, especially before some postpositions.

Pronouns
The 1st and 2nd person pronouns have special forms:

The 3rd person (demonstrative) pronouns are regular: /un/, /u.ˈʃan/, /i.ˈʃan/

Postpositions
With the genitive can be combined many postpositions. Examples:

The personal pronouns have special forms with "-re": mere, tere, etc.

Adjectives
Gilaki adjectives come before the noun they modify, and may have the genitive "case ending" -ə/-i. They do not agree with the nouns they modify.

Example for adjectival modification: Western Gilaki: pilla-yi zakan (big children), Surx gul (red flower). Eastern Gilaki: Sərd ow (cold water) (ɑb-e særd in Persian), kul čaqu (dull knife) (čaqu-ye kond in Persian).

Possessive constructions

Examples for possessive constructions of nouns in Western Gilaki: məhine zakan (Mæhin's children) (Bæče-ha-ye Mæhin in Persian), Baγi gulan (garden flowers) (Gol-ha-ye Baγ in Persian). In Eastern Gilaki: Xirsi Kuti (bear cub) (Bæč-e Xers in Persian).

Vocabulary

Comparison of Gilaki, Mazandarani, Kurmanci, Zazaki and Balochi

Notes

Further reading 
 Christensen, Arthur Emanuel. 1930. Dialect Guiläki de Recht [The Gilaki dialect of Rasht]. In Contributions à la dialectologie iranienne. Series: Kgl. danske videnskabernes selskab. Historisk-filologiske meddelelser; 17, 2. (translated into Persian 1995)
 Purriyahi, Masud. 1971. Barresi-ye dastur-e guyesh-e Gilaki-ye Rasht [A Grammatical Study of the Gilaki dialect of Rasht]. Dissertation, Tehran University.
 Sartippur, Jahangir. 1990/1369 A.P. Vižegihā-ye Dasturi va Farhang-e vāžehā-ye Gilaki [Grammatical Characteristics and Glossary of Gilaki]. Rasht: Nashr-e Gilakan. Dictionary.
 Shokri, Giti. 1998. Māzi-ye Naqli dar Guyeshhā-ye Gilaki va Mazandarāni [Present perfect in Gilani and Mazandarāni Dialects]. Nāme-ye Farhangestān 4(4(16)):59–69. (quarterly journal of Iranian Academy of Persian Language and Literature) Article abstract in English.
 Rastorgueva, V., Kerimova, A., Mamedzade, A., Pireiko, L., Edel’man, D. & Lockwood, R. M. 2012. The Gilaki Language. Uppsala: Acta Universitatis Upsaliensis.

External links

Scientific Information Database of the Iranian Academic Center for Education, Culture, and Research
Sample recording in Gilaki
Dictionary of Gilaki (Dialect of Lahijan) and some of its characteristics
Open access recordings of a Gilaki song and basic word list are available through Kaipuleohone

Northwestern Iranian languages
Languages of Iran
Caspian languages